The National Student Organization of American Football ( or ONEFA) is the major college football league in Mexico.

American football has been played in Mexico since the early 1920s in different colleges and universities, mainly in Mexico City. In 1928 the first professional championship was played, organized by Jorge Braniff. From the 1920s to the 1970s more universities and colleges joined the championship, and four categories, called fuerzas were created. The First Fuerza became the National League in 1970, and in 1978 it was reorganized under the name ONEFA.

In 2010 a breakaway league, CONADEIP, was formed by the Monterrey Institute of Technology and Higher Education system, UDLAP and additional private universities. In 2017, the leagues started staging regular season matches and a National Championship. However, that only lasted for a year as in 2018, they did not stage regular season matches and cancelled the National Championship Game. The only two ONEFA teams that have maintained scheduling games (preseason) from 2013-2019 are the Borregos Salvajes Monterrey and the Auténticos Tigres UANL.

The universities that originally participated in the ONEFA were Universidad Autónoma de Nuevo León, Universidad Autónoma de Chapingo, Instituto Politécnico Nacional, Universidad Autónoma de Coahuila, Universidad Autónoma de Chihuahua and Universidad Autónoma Agraria Antonio Narro.

Today the ONEFA is formed by 100 teams divided into four categories: Liga Mayor (College), Liga Intermedia (Undergrad/ Varsity High School, Liga Juvenil (two categoriesJunior High/ Middle School), and Liga Infantil (six categoriesMiddle School/ Elementary School).

The most important one is the Liga Mayor ("Major League"college level), whose championships, until 2014, were organized into two conferences: the Big 8 Conference, and the National Conference. The champion of the National Conference was promoted to the Big 8 Conference taking the spot of the team in last place which, in turn, was relegated to the National Conference. For the 2015 season, there are 19 teams participating divided into three conferences: Green, White, and Red. The teams from the Green and the White conferences are eligible to play for the national championship.

Teams 

The following teams are members of Liga Mayor. Liga Mayor has 3 conferences: Verde (Green), Blanco (White), and Rojo (Red).
Enrollment numbers represent all campuses of each university.

National champions

  Year with one national champion (Big 12 Conference), Central Conference which was not the top level, was recognized as national champion.
  Year with two national champions, one champion for the top level Conference (Big 8 Conference) and other for the National Conference.
  Years with one National Champion (Central Conference) and the other Conferences recognized as national champions although they were not the top level.
 † Defunct conference

Source:

See also
2007 ONEFA

References

External links
  

National Student Organization of American Football
Sports organizations established in 1978
1978 establishments in Mexico